Anne Merriman, MBE, MCommH, FRCPI, FRCP (born 1935 in Liverpool, England) is a British doctor, known for her pioneering work and influential research into palliative care in developing countries in Africa. She has campaigned to make affordable oral morphine widely available.

In 1993, Dr. Merriman founded Hospice Africa Uganda. Under Anne Merriman's guidance, this introduced a model system of terminal care customized to developing countries with limited resources. From Hospice Africa Uganda (HAU) the Palliative Care Association of Uganda and was founded and Anne was the founding Vice President. On a continent-wide basis, she is a founder member of the African Palliative Care Association.

Biography
Anne Merriman was born in 1935 in Liverpool, where she spent her childhood. She went to Ireland in 1953 and was enrolled in the UCD Medical School in 1957. After qualification in 1963, she completed an internship in the International Missionary Training Hospital in Medicine in Drogheda. Over the first decade of her post-graduate career, she completed three two-year stints in three Medical Missionaries of Mary hospitals in southeast Nigeria. This was interspersed with posts in Drogheda, Dublin and Edinburgh, during which she successfully took her MRCPI and MRCP Edinburgh as well as diplomas in child health and tropical medicine.

Since graduating as a medical doctor, Merriman has spent 33 years working in Africa (including 10 in Nigeria as a missionary doctor and 20 in Uganda), seven in Southeast Asia, eight in the United Kingdom, and five in Ireland. She introduced palliative care into Singapore in 1985, which became an accepted form of care with the founding of the Hospice Care Association in 1989, while Senior Teaching Fellow in the Department of Community, Occupational and Family Medicine (COFM) in the National University of Singapore. This service is still fully functional in Southeast Asia. In 1990, Merriman returned to Africa, initially to Nairobi Hospice, before founding Hospice Africa. She introduced palliative care to Uganda in 1993, by forming an adaptable and affordable model, Hospice Africa Uganda (HAU).

Early life
Born in Liverpool into an Irish Catholic family, she went to Ireland when she was 18 to join the Medical Missionaries of Mary. She grew up in war-time Merseyside, seeking protection from bombs in Air-raid shelters. After the war ended, when Anne was 12, her brother Bernard (11) fell ill. Within a fortnight, he was dead from a brain tumour. The family was devastated. As Anne entered her teens, she began considering a career in medicine. During this time a local cinema screened a film about the Medical Missionaries of Mary and the work of its Irish head, Mother Mary Martin, in Africa. This was a large influence on Anne and at 18, she joined the order in Drogheda.

After graduation, Merriman was sent to work at St Luke's Hospital, Anua, in south-eastern Nigeria.

Published works
Audacity to Love: The Story of Hospice Africa: Bringing Hope and Peace for the Dying

Audacity to Love is the chronicle of Merriman's work in bringing to life her vision of making affordable pain relief to dying patients throughout the poorest countries of Africa. In this book, Merriman writes of those with whom she has worked, as well as of patients, lessons learned and support received in setting up Hospice Africa.

Current work
Presently, Merriman heads Hospice Africa's International Programs, supporting new initiatives in Tanzania, Nigeria, Cameroon, Sierra Leone, Malawi, Ethiopia, Zambia, Sudan and Rwanda, and more recently training, initiators from 11 Francophone countries to suit their different health service and needs.

Her introduction of affordable oral morphine suitable for use in the home, has revolutionised dying in Africa. Most wish to die at home and can now die in peace with their families and their God, close to their ancestors.  However this has to spread to many countries and to be widely available to the millions still suffering terrible pain because this is still not available to them. Since 2004, the Ugandan Government has provided this medication free to any person who is prescribed it by a registered prescriber, a first in Africa today.

Honors
 First award from International Association of Hospice and Palliative Care 2001, for initiating and promoting palliative care in Africa
 Honorary Fellowship from John Moore's University, Liverpool for contribution to relief of pain in the world
 MBE (Member of British Empire) Honor conferred in 2003 for contribution to health in Uganda.
 Honorary Doctorate of Science at UCD (NUI) for contribution to palliative care in Africa
 Honorary DSc from Edge Hill University, Merseyside, for contribution to palliative care in Africa
 UCD Alumnus of the Year in Health Sciences 2016

Accomplishments
 Founder and Director of Policy and International Programs, Hospice Africa Uganda
 Honorary Teaching Fellow, International Observatory on End of Life Care in the Institute for Health Research, Lancaster University.
 Honorary Professor of Palliative Care at Makerere University in Kampala, Uganda
 Founder Member and the Founding Vice Chair of the Board of the Palliative Care Association of Uganda (formed in 1999)
 Founder Member and the Founding Vice Chair of the Board of the African Palliative Care Association (formed in 2003)
 Board Member of Hospice Africa UK and Hospice Africa
 Past Board Member of the International Association for Hospice and Palliative Care (IAHPC)
 Vice President for East Africa of the African Organizations for Research and Training in Cancer (AORTIC)

Education
 MB BCh BAO: University College Dublin 1963
 DCH: Diploma in child health
 DTM&H: Diploma in Tropical Medicine and Hygiene
 MComm H: Master's in International Community Health
 FRCM (Nig): Fellow of the College of Medicine in Nigeria
 AM(Sing ): Member of the Academy of Medicine in Singapore
 FRCP (Edin) Fellow of the Royal College of Physicians in Edinburgh
 FRCP(Ire): Fellow of the Royal College of Physicians in Ireland

References

External links
AnneMerriman.com
Hospice Africa Uganda
Hospice Africa
Foundation for Hospices in Sub-Saharan Africa
Inctr-news.wikidot.com
Who.int

20th-century English medical doctors
1935 births
Living people
Palliative care
Members of the Royal College of Physicians of Ireland
Fellows of the Royal College of Physicians of Ireland